Plantar artery may refer to

 Common plantar digital arteries
 Deep plantar artery
 Lateral plantar artery
 Medial plantar artery
 Plantar metatarsal arteries
 Proper plantar digital arteries